Mohamad Alif bin Hassan (born 14 May 1994) is Malaysian footballer who plays as a midfielder for Kuching City.

References

External links
 

1994 births
Living people
Malaysian footballers
Sarawak FA players
Sarawak United FC players
Kuching City F.C. players
Malaysia Super League players
Association football midfielders